The Brownsville B&M Port of Entry opened in 1909 with the completion of the Brownsville & Matamoros International Bridge.  The bridge was built to carry trains, horses, wagons and pedestrians.  The original bridge could swing open to allow river traffic to pass; however it was a function that was almost never used due to the shallowness of the Rio Grande.  The bridge was substantially renovated in 1953, and a second 4-lane bridge dedicated to northbound traffic was built adjacent to it in 1997.  Since 1999, all truck traffic has been diverted to the Veterans and Los Indios crossings.

References

See also

 List of Mexico–United States border crossings
 List of Canada–United States border crossings

Mexico–United States border crossings
1909 establishments in Texas
Buildings and structures completed in 1909
Buildings and structures in Cameron County, Texas